Noah Luke Toribio (born March 14, 1999) is a professional footballer who plays as a defender for Liepāja. Born in England, he has represented the United States at youth level.

Career

Club career

In 2015, Toribio joined the youth academy of Argentine side Banfield. In 2020, he signed for Vélez in the Spanish fourth division after trialing for American top flight club Minnesota United, Larne in Northern Ireland, English third division team Fleetwood Town, and FC Utrecht in the Dutch top flight. In his only year with Vélez, he helped them earn promotion to the Spanish third division. In 2021, he signed for Greek second division outfit Ierapetra. On November 20, Toribio debuted for OFI during a 2–0 loss to Egaleo.

International career

In 2016, Toribio represented the United States under-18 team in a friendly against the South Florida Surf of the Premier Development League. He also remains eligible to represent England, Italy, or Argentina in addition to the United States.

References

External links
 

1999 births
Living people
American expatriate sportspeople in Argentina
American expatriate sportspeople in Greece
American expatriate sportspeople in Spain
American people of Argentine descent
Sportspeople of Argentine descent
American people of English descent
American soccer players
Association football defenders
English expatriate footballers
English expatriate sportspeople in Argentina
English expatriate sportspeople in Greece
English expatriate sportspeople in Spain
English expatriate sportspeople in the United States
English footballers
English people of Argentine descent
Expatriate footballers in Argentina
Expatriate footballers in Greece
Expatriate footballers in Spain
Expatriate soccer players in the United States
Footballers from Greater London
O.F. Ierapetra F.C. players
Super League Greece 2 players
Tercera División players
Vélez CF players
FK Liepāja players
Latvian Higher League players
Expatriate footballers in Latvia
English expatriate sportspeople in Latvia